Luis Alcoriza de la Vega (September 5, 1918 – December 3, 1992) was a respected Mexican screenwriter, film director, and actor.

Alcoriza was born in Spain and, exiled because of the Spanish Civil War, established himself in Mexico from 1940. His 1962 film Tlayucan was nominated for the Academy Award for Best Foreign Language Film. His 1987 film Life Is Most Important was entered into the 15th Moscow International Film Festival.

Filmography

Screenwriter 
 1946 : El ahijado de la muerte
 1947 : Una extraña mujer
 1948 : Nocturno de amor 
 1948 : Enrédate y verás
 1948 : Flor de caña
 1949 : Negra consentida
 1949 : Los amores de una viuda
 1949 : El gran calavera
 1949 : Un cuerpo de mujer
 1950 : Tú, solo tú
 1950 : La liga de las muchachas
 1950 : Hipólito el de Santa
 1950 : Mala hembra
 1950 : Si me viera don Porfirio
 1950 : Huellas del pasado
 1950 : Los olvidados
 1951 : La hija del engaño
 1951 : Los enredos de una gallega
 1951 : Canasta uruguaya
 1951 : Anillo de compromiso
 1952 : Hambre nuestra de cada día
 1952 : Carne de presidio
 1953 : El Bruto
 1953 : No te ofendas, Beatriz
 1953 : Él
 1953 : The Island of Women 
 1954 : La ilusión viaja en tranvía
 1954 : La visita que no tocó el timbre
 1954 : Sombra verde
 1955 : ...Y mañana serán mujeres
 1955 : La vida no vale nada
 1955 : El río y la muerte
 1956 : The King of Mexico
 1956 : El inocente
 1956 : La muerte en este jardín
 1957 : Morir de pie
 1958 : A media luz los tres
 1958 : Escuela de rateros
 1959 : El cariñoso
 1959 : El hombre de alazán
 1959 : La Fièvre Monte à El Pao
 1959 : El toro negro
 1960 : Los jóvenes
 1961 : Guantes de oro
 1961 : ¡Suicídate, mi amor!
 1962 : El ángel exterminador (L'Ange exterminateur)
 1962 : Tlayucan
 1963 : Tiburoneros
 1963 : Safo'63
 1965 : El gángster
 1964 : Tarahumara (Cada vez más lejos) (Toujour plus loins)
 1966 : Divertimento: Juego peligroso (Jôgo perigroso)
 1968 : La puerta y La mujer del carnicero
 1968 : Romeo contra Julieta
 1969 : Persíguelas y alcanzalas
 1970 : Pancho Tequila
 1970 : El oficio más antiguo del mundo
 1970 : Paraíso
 1971 : La chamuscada
 1972 : Mecánica nacional
 1974 : El muro del silencio
 1975 : Presagio
 1975 : Las fuerzas vivas
 1979 : En la trampa
 1981 : Semana santa en Acapulco
 1982 : Tac-tac (Han violado a una mujer)
 1983 : El amor es un juego extraño
 1987 : Lo que importa es vivir
 1988 : Viacrucis nacional (Día de difuntos)
 1990 : La sombra del ciprés es alargada
 1994 : 7000 días juntos
 1996 : Pesadilla para un rico

Director 
 1961 : Los jóvenes
 1962 : Tlayucan
 1963 : Tiburoneros
 1964 : Amor y sexo
 1965 : El gángster
 1965 : Tarahumara (cada vez más lejos)
 1967 : Juego peligroso
 1968 : La puerta y la mujer del carnicero
 1970 : El oficio más antiguo del mundo
 1970 : Paraíso
 1972 : Mecánica nacional
 1974 : El muro del silencio
 1974 : Fe, esperanza y caridad
 1975 : Presagio
 1975 : Las fuerzas vivas
 1980 : A paso de cojo
 1981 : Semana santa en Acapulco
 1982 : Tac-tac
 1983 : El amor es un juego extraño
 1985 : Terror y encajes negros
 1987 : Life Is Most Important
 1988 : Día de muertos
 1990 : La sombra del ciprés es alargada

Actor 
 1941 : La Torre de los suplicios
 1942 : La Vírgen morena
 1943 : Los Miserables
 1943 : El rayo del sur
 1944 : San Francisco de Asís
 1944 : Nana : De Fauchery
 1944 : Rosa de las nieves
 1945 : Sierra Morena
 1945 : El Capitán Malacara
 1946 : María Magdalena: Pecadora de Magdala : Jesús Nazareno
 1948 : Reina de reinas: La Virgen María : Jesús, el Nazareno
 1948 : La casa de la Troya
 1948 : Flor de caña
 1949 : El gran calavera : Alfredo
 1950 : Tú, solo tú
 1950 : La Liga de las muchachas

References

External links

1918 births
1992 deaths
Ariel Award winners
Best Director Ariel Award winners
Mexican male screenwriters
Mexican film directors
Mexican male film actors
20th-century Mexican male actors
Spanish emigrants to Mexico
People from Badajoz
20th-century Mexican screenwriters
20th-century Mexican male writers